Monica Marie Woods-Gray (born August 29, 1972, in South Bend, Indiana) is a meteorologist at an ABC affiliate in Sacramento, California KXTV ABC10. On May 31, 2011, she became the Chief Meteorologist at KXTV and moved to the evening news at 5pm, 6pm and 11pm.  She joined the station in April 2001 as a weekend meteorologist and four months later switched to the morning shift in August 2001. Before coming to Sacramento she worked at WXIA-TV 11 in Atlanta, Georgia as the morning/ noon meteorologist anchor from 1999 to 2001. And before her move to the South East she was the weeknight meteorologist at KTXL FOX40 in Sacramento from 1995 to 1999. Monica got her first start in TV at WKAG in Hopkinsville, Kentucky where she weathered the weeknight's newscast.

Monica is married to Walter J. Gray also known as Walt Gray, former anchor of the morning and noon newscasts at KCRA-TV in Sacramento and now works at News 10 with his wife. Together they reside in Sacramento with 2 daughters named Abby and Kelly, and a son named Joseph. Her interests include running, swimming and spending time with her family. She is a member of the National Weather Association and holds the NWA Seal of Approval. She is a former president of the local chapter of the American Meteorology Society, which is composed of current and former area weather professionals.

References

External links
Monica Woods biography at KXTV
Monica Woods' station's online Blog.

Living people
Television anchors from Sacramento, California
1972 births
People from St. Joseph County, Indiana
People from Elk Grove, California